Taikang may refer to:

Taikang County (太康县), of Zhoukou, Henan
Tai Kang, king of the Xia Dynasty
Taikang Life Insurance, major Chinese insurance company
Taikang, Dorbod County (泰康镇), town in Dorbod Mongol Autonomous County, Heilongjiang, China
Taikang Railway Station, in Heilongjiang, China